The 2019–20 National Cricket League was the twenty-first edition of the National Cricket League (NCL), a first-class cricket competition that was held in Bangladesh. The tournament started on 10 October 2019, with eight teams placed into two tiers. The matches were used as the national team's preparation for their Test series against India in November 2019. Rajshahi Division were the defending champions.

On 5 November 2019, Abdur Razzak took his 600th first-class wicket, becoming the first Bangladeshi bowler to reach the milestone. On 18 November 2019, Shahadat Hossain of Dhaka Division was withdrawn mid-way through the match with Khulna Division, after he physically assaulted teammate Arafat Sunny. Shahadat initially faced a ban from cricket of up to one year. However, he was given a five-year ban, with two years suspended for the incident.

Khulna Division won the tournament, beating Dhaka Division by nine wickets in the final round of matches. It was their seventh win, a record for victories in the NCL. In Tier 2, Sylhet Division secured promotion to Tier 1, after beating Chittagong Division, also by the margin of nine wickets. Defending champions, Rajshahi Division, finished bottom of Tier 1 and were relegated to Tier 2.

Fixtures

Tier 1
Points table

Tier 2
Points table

References

External links
 Series home at ESPN Cricinfo

2019-20
Bangladesh National Cricket League
2019 in Bangladeshi cricket
2020 in Bangladeshi cricket
Bangladeshi cricket seasons from 2000–01